Mohd Firdaus Jaafar (born 15 March 1974) is a Malaysian politician of Parti Amanah Negara (AMANAH), a component party of Pakatan Harapan (PH) coalition. He was the Member of Parliament of Malaysia for the Jerai constituency in Kedah for one term from 2008 to 2013. He was a member of Pan-Malaysian Islamic Party (PAS) before joining AMANAH in 2016. Firdaus was elected to the Jerai seat in the 2008 election, defeating incumbent Badruddin Amiruldin of the ruling Barisan Nasional (BN) coalition. Prior to the election, Firdaus was a religious teacher. He was defeated in the 2013 election by BN's Jamil Khir Baharom.

Election results

See also
Jerai (federal constituency)

References

1974 births
People from Kedah
Living people
National Trust Party (Malaysia) politicians
Former Malaysian Islamic Party politicians
Malaysian people of Malay descent
Malaysian Muslims
Members of the Dewan Rakyat
21st-century Malaysian politicians